San Demetrio ne'Vestini is a comune and town in the Province of L'Aquila in the Abruzzo region of Italy

In the 18th century, San Demetrio ne' Vestini was ruled by Duke Filippo Arcamone. His son Vincenzo later became the last duke of the town and died with no heirs.

Transport 
San Demetrio has a station on the Terni–Sulmona railway, with trains to L'Aquila and Sulmona.

References

Cities and towns in Abruzzo